is a Japanese boxer. He competed in the men's featherweight event at the 1968 Summer Olympics. At the 1968 Summer Olympics, he lost to Kim Seong-eun of South Korea.

References

1947 births
Living people
Japanese male boxers
Olympic boxers of Japan
Boxers at the 1968 Summer Olympics
Sportspeople from Shizuoka Prefecture
Featherweight boxers